Gabriella Tóth may refer to:

 Gabriella Tóth (footballer) (born 1986), Hungarian football midfielder
 Gabriella Tóth (handballer) (born 1996), Hungarian handball player